Naranjal (Spanish: "orange grove") is a municipality in the Mexican state of Veracruz, located  south of the city of Córdoba.

Geography
It borders the municipalities of Fortín to the north, Amatlán de los Reyes to the northeast, Coetzala to the southeast, Zongolica to the south, Tequila to the southwest, and Ixtaczoquitlán to the northwest.

The municipality is located on the southern bank of the Río Blanco and is watered by that river and its tributaries. Most of the land in Naranjal (90.41%) is used for agriculture. The dominant soils in the municipality are luvisols, acrisols and vertisols.

Naranjal's climate is humid with rain falling mostly in the summer.

History
Naranjal established its first town council in 1814. On 28 March 1831 it was incorporated under the name of San Cristóbal Naranjal as a municipality in the canton of Orizaba in the state of Veracruz. Naranjal became a free municipality on 15 January 1918.

Administration
The municipal government comprises a president, a councillor (Spanish: síndico), and a trustee (regidor). The current president of the municipality is Karla Nancy Abad Sosa.

Demographics
In the 2010 Mexican Census, the municipality of Naranjal recorded a population of 4507 inhabitants living in 1049 households. The 2015 Intercensal Survey estimated a population of 4559 inhabitants in Naranjal, of whom 71.11% reported being of Indigenous ancestry and 19.61% reported being of African ancestry. 

There are 12 localities in the municipality, of which only the municipal seat, also called Naranjal, is classified as urban. It recorded a population of 2261 inhabitants in the 2010 Census.

Economy
The main economic activity in Naranjal is farming. Coffee, bananas and oranges are the main crops grown, comprising respectively 80%, 10% and 7% of the agricultural land in the municipality.

References

Municipalities of Veracruz
1831 establishments in Mexico
States and territories established in 1831